District 12 is an electoral district in Malta.  It was established in 1976. Its boundaries have changed many times but it currently consists of the localities of Mellieħa, St. Paul's Bay and part of Naxxar.

Representatives

2017 General Election

References 

 

Districts of Malta